The association football tournament at the 2011 Southeast Asian Games (Indonesian: Sepak bola di SEA Games 2011) took place from 3 to 21 November 2011. This edition of the tournament was only for the men's competition. No women's competition was held as the host nation Indonesia did not have enough stadiums to host two categories of football at the same time, but other reasons were put into consideration, such as the poor performance of the Indonesian women's national team. It was played among U-23 (under 23 years old) national teams. All matches took place in Jakarta. This was the first time that all Southeast Asian nations participated in the football tournament at a SEA Games.

Venues

Squads

Group stage 
All times are West Indonesian Time (WIB) – UTC+7.

Group A 
In the last week of October 2011, the Football Association of Indonesia had rescheduled the first round of matches for the group twice, originally moving it forward to 8 November and eventually to 7 November. The second, third and fourth round of fixture had also been moved forward accordingly while the final round of fixtures remained on the 17th.

Group B

Knockout stage

Semi-finals

Bronze medal match

Gold medal match

Awards

Medal winners

Goalscorers 
6 goals
 Lamnao Singto

5 goals

 Patrich Wanggai
 Kyaw Ko Ko
 Nguyễn Văn Quyết

4 goals
 Titus Bonai

3 goals

 Adi Said
 Baddrol Bakhtiar
 Kyaw Zayar Win
 Joshua Beloya
 Murilo de Almeida

2 goals

 Chhin Chhoeun
 Gunawan Dwi Cahyo
 Izzaq Faris Ramlan
 Min Min Thu
 Yan Aung Win
 Manuel Ott
 Attapong Nooprom
 Natarid Thammarossopon
 Hoàng Đình Tùng
 Lâm Anh Quang
 Lê Hoàng Thiên
 Lê Văn Thắng

1 goal

 Najib Tarif
 Reduan Petara
 Andik Vermansyah
 Ferdinand Sinaga
 Ramdani Lestaluhu
 Keoviengphet Liththideth
 Manolom Phomsouvanh
 Paseuthsack Souliyavong
 Sangvone Phimmasen
 Fakri Saarani
 Asraruddin Putra Omar
 Syahrul Azwari
 Wan Zaharulnizam
 Aye San
 Kyi Lin
 Mai Aih Naing
 Pyae Phyo Oo
 Yan Aung Win 
 OJ Porteria
 Gabriel Quak
 Khairul Nizam
 Nigel Vanu
 Safirul Sulaiman
 Kroekrit Thaweekarn
 Ronnachai Rangsiyo
 Diogo Rangel
 Âu Văn Hoàn
 Hoàng Văn Bình
 Nguyễn Trọng Hoàng
 Phạm Thành Lương

Own goal
 Matthew Hartmann (for Vietnam)
 Hoàng Đình Tùng (for Myanmar)

Final ranking

References 

 
Football at the Southeast Asian Games